The 1945 Local Council meeting of the Russian Orthodox Church took place in the period from January 31 to February 4, 1945, in Moscow, in the  in Sokolniki District of the city. The meeting was attended by all registered bishops, together with representatives of the clergy and laity of their dioceses. Among the honored guests present at the Council were patriarchs of Alexandria (Christopher II), Antioch (Alexander III), Georgia (Callistratus), and representatives of Constantinople, Jerusalem, Serbian and Romanian churches. To the meeting were also sent 2 representatives of the North American archdiocese, but due to difficulties they wartime they missed the meeting. At the Council, 171 people attended from various dioceses and provinces. In the list is the 61 dioceses in the USSR and one overseas (North American). In this meeting ruling bishops in the USSR was only 44. The right to vote at the Council was given to some bishops.

The meeting was promoted in Soviet propaganda as an example of freedom of religion in the Soviet Union. For the successful conduct of the meeting Georgy Kaparov, chairman of the Council on the Russian Orthodox Church at the USSR, was awarded the Order of the Red Banner of Labour.

References

1945 in Christianity
1945 in the Soviet Union
20th-century Eastern Orthodoxy
Eastern Orthodoxy in the Soviet Union
History of the Russian Orthodox Church
Russian Orthodox Church in Russia
1945 conferences